Rakesh Mohan (born 1948) is an Indian economist and former Deputy Governor of Reserve Bank of India. He is the Vice Chairperson of Indian Institute for Human Settlements. He was appointed in November 2012 as an Executive Director of the IMF for a three-year term, and in April 2010, he joined Nestlé India, as a non-executive director.

He remained an adviser to numerous ministries in Government of India, including industry, and finance, and later became an important part of Indian economic reforms in the 1990s, and his report under the 'Rakesh Mohan Committee on Infrastructure', became a "landmark document in the evolution of thinking on economic policy issues". He is the Professor in the Practice of International Economics of Finance, Yale School of Management, and Senior Fellow, Jackson Institute for Global Affairs at Yale University and will shortly be taking over as India's Executive Director at the International Monetary Fund, Washington DC, USA.

Early life
Mohan attended Mayo College, a boarding school in Rajasthan. He then received a B.Sc. in electrical engineering from Imperial College London in 1969 and a B.A. in economics from Yale University in 1971. He received his Ph.D. in economics from Princeton University in 1977 after completing a doctoral dissertation titled "Development, structural change and urbanization: explorations with a dynamic three sector general equilibrium model applied to India, 1951-1984."

Career
Mohan started his career in urban economics, 1974 to 1988. During this period, as a part of the World Bank's, City Study project, he studied the city of Bogota, Colombia, 1976–1980. He returned to India in 1980, where he first joined the Planning Commission as a senior consultant, while Manmohan Singh was also a member.

In 1985 according to the American Economic Association he was listed as "Economist" in the Philippines Division of the World Bank with research interests listed as "Economic policy and analysis of the Philippines".

He became the Deputy Governor, Reserve Bank of India (RBI) in September 2002 and moved to North Block in October 2004 as Secretary, Department of Economic Affairs and Chief Economic Adviser to the Finance Minister of India till July 2005, before returning to RBI, where he remained till June 2009, when he took up an assignment at Stanford Centre for International Development at Stanford University, US, and subsequently joined McKinsey and Co's economic research wing. In 2010 back in India from his project, he worked with Nandan Nilekani, Shirish Patel, Keshub Mahindra, Deepak Parekh, to set up Indian Institute for Human Settlements, in Delhi.

In April 2010, he joined the board of directors of Nestle India.

In November 2012, he joined IMF as executive director. In addition to India, Mohan will also represent three other countries including Bangladesh, Sri Lanka and Bhutan on the IMF board.  Also, he is on the advisory board of OMFIF where he is regularly involved in meetings regarding the financial and monetary system.

Bibliography
 Urban economic and planning models: assessing the potential for cities in developing countries. Johns Hopkins University Press (for the World Bank), 1979. .
 Work, wages, and welfare in a developing, metropolis: consequences of growth in Bogotá, Colombia. A World Bank Publication. Oxford University Press US, 1986. .
 Understanding the developing metropolis: lessons from the city study of Bogotá and Cali, Colombia. A World Bank Publication. Oxford University Press US, 1994. .
 Policy reform in India, with Omkar Goswami, Isher Judge Ahluwalia, Ed Charles Oman. OECD Publishing, 1996. .
 INDIA'S ECONOMY— Performance and Challenges. with Shankar Acharya (ed); Oxford University Press. 2010, .

References

External links
 Indian Institute of Human Settlements, website
 Rakesh Mohan Committee Report – Highlights of the Executive Summary

1948 births
Living people
Alumni of the University of London
Alumni of Imperial College London
Yale University alumni
Princeton University alumni
20th-century Indian economists
Scientists from Rajasthan
Chief Economic Advisers to the Government of India